Anthony is a city in and the county seat of Harper County, Kansas, United States.  As of the 2020 census, the population of the city was 2,108.

History
The Anthony townsite was laid out in 1878. The city was named after the 7th governor of Kansas, George T. Anthony who was in office at the time. Following the reorganization of Harper County in 1878 following the original fraudulent organization in 1873, Anthony was designated the temporary county seat, as Bluff City, designated county seat of the fraudulent county organization, did not exist at the time. In 1879, a county seat election was held, and Anthony won over Harper City even though 2,960 ballots were cast with 800 legal voters in the county.

Anthony existed at the intersection of the St. Louis-San Francisco Railroad and the Missouri Pacific Railway since at least 1891.  Three additional railroads came through town by 1912: the Choctaw Northern Railroad (by then owned by the Chicago, Rock Island and Pacific Railroad), the Kansas City, Mexico and Orient Railroad and the Kansas Southwestern Railway (the latter two becoming part of the Atchison, Topeka and Santa Fe Railway.  However, rail abandonments began around 1986, leaving Anthony without any rail service by 2000.

Geography
Anthony is located at  (37.153902, -98.029396).

Climate
The climate in this area is characterized by hot, humid summers and generally mild to cool winters.  According to the Köppen Climate Classification system, Anthony has a humid subtropical climate, abbreviated "Cfa" on climate maps.

Demographics

2010 census
As of the census of 2010, there were 2,269 people, 977 households, and 631 families residing in the city. The racial makeup of the city was 94.0% White, 0.5% African American, 1.3% Native American, 0.2% Asian, 0.3% Pacific Islander, 1.5% from other races, and 2.2% from two or more races. Hispanic or Latino of any race were 4.0% of the population.

There were 977 households, of which 28.5% had children under the age of 18 living with them, 48.0% were married couples living together, 12.1% had a female householder with no husband present, 4.5% had a male householder with no wife present, and 35.4% were non-families. 31.7% of all households were made up of individuals, and 16.6% had someone living alone who was 65 years of age or older. The average household size was 2.26 and the average family size was 2.79.

The median age in the city was 43.1 years. 23.8% of residents were under the age of 18; 6.1% were between the ages of 18 and 24; 22% were from 25 to 44; 25.5% were from 45 to 64; and 22.5% were 65 years of age or older. The gender makeup of the city was 48.1% male and 51.9% female.

2000 census
As of the census of 2000, there were 2,440 people, 1,059 households, and 659 families residing in the city. The racial makeup of the city was 96.19% White, 0.29% African American, 0.98% Native American, 0.20% Asian, 0.53% from other races, and 1.80% from two or more races. Hispanic or Latino of any race were 1.48% of the population.

There were 1,059 households, out of which 28.7% had children under the age of 18 living with them, 51.0% were married couples living together, 7.7% had a female householder with no husband present, and 37.7% were non-families. 34.8% of all households were made up of individuals, and 21.5% had someone living alone who was 65 years of age or older. The average household size was 2.25 and the average family size was 2.91.

In the city, the population was spread out, with 25.8% under the age of 18, 7.5% from 18 to 24, 21.9% from 25 to 44, 20.7% from 45 to 64, and 24.1% who were 65 years of age or older. The median age was 41 years. For every 100 females, there were 90.9 males. For every 100 females age 18 and over, there were 84.3 males.

The median income for a household in the city was $24,730, and the median income for a family was $37,321. Males had a median income of $27,042 versus $17,604 for females. The per capita income for the city was $14,540. About 12.8% of families and 16.4% of the population were below the poverty line, including 24.8% of those under age 18 and 8.4% of those age 65 or over.

Education
The community is served by Chaparral USD 361 public school district. USD 361 was created through school unification that consolidated Anthony and Harper schools.

Both Anthony and Harper have elementary schools. The district high school, Chaparral High School, is located halfway between the two towns. The Chaparral High School mascot is Roadrunners.

Anthony High School was closed through school unification. The Anthony High School mascot was Pirates.

Notable people
 Dennis Moore, Congressman, 3rd District Kansas 1999–2011, born in Anthony.
 Virgil A. Richard, United States Army general, was born in Anthony.
Neal Patterson, American businessman who was CEO of Cerner Corporation (medical software company) and owner of the Sporting Kansas City soccer team

References

Further reading

External links

 City of Anthony
 Attica - Directory of Public Officials
 Anthony Chamber of Commerce
 Anthony city map, KDOT

Cities in Kansas
County seats in Kansas
Cities in Harper County, Kansas
1878 establishments in Kansas
Populated places established in 1878